The thirty-first season of the Case Closed anime was directed by Yasuichirō Yamamoto and Nobuharu Kamanaka, and produced by TMS Entertainment and Yomiuri Telecasting Corporation. The series is based on Gosho Aoyama's Case Closed manga series. In Japan, the series is titled Meitantei Conan (名探偵コナン, lit. Great Detective Conan, officially translated as Detective Conan) but was changed due to legal issues with the title Detective Conan. The series focuses on the adventures of teenage detective Shinichi Kudo who was turned into a child by a poison called APTX 4869, but continues working as a detective under the alias Conan Edogawa.

The episodes use eight pieces of theme music: four openings and four endings.

The first ending theme is Reboot by Airi Miyakawa used for episodes 993 (season 30) - 1015.

The second opening theme is YURA YURA by WANDS used for episodes 1021 - 1032.

The third ending theme is SWEET MOONLIGHT by BREAKERZ used for episodes 1029 - 1038.

The third opening theme is SLEEPLESS by B'z used for episodes 1033 - 1048.

The fourth opening theme is SPARKLE by Maki Ohguro used since episode 1049.

Yudai Ohno (from Da-iCE) used for episodes 1058 - 1073.

The season has been airing since March 6, 2021 on Nippon Television Network System in Japan.



Episode list

Notes

References

Season 31
2021 Japanese television seasons
2022 Japanese television seasons
2023 Japanese television seasons